Alan Monken Arruda (born September 12, 1981) is a Brazilian professional footballer and coach, who currently is based in Tallinn as a coach for JK Tabasalu of the Esiliiga B.

Career
He joined to Estonian club JK Nõmme Kalju after pay for Serrano Football Club, Ferencváros Torna Club, ASV Spratzern, Paraíba do Sul Fc, Helsinki Diplomat Sports Club and became the team captain of the Meistriliiga team. His former clubs include Serrano Football Club, Ferencvárosi TC and Paraíba do Sul F. C.. Arruda scored his first Meistriliiga goal on March 22, 2008, in the 24th minute free kick in a 0–1 win against FC TVMK. In 2010 Alan Arruda transfer to Finland and play for FC Atlantis, 2012 became a club (player/head coach). At the moment Alan Arruda play for FC Britannia XI Gibraltar Premier League club.

Position
He plays the position of Central or offensive midfielder.

Coach
Arruda was appointed as head coach by Atlantis FC in May 2012.

Honours

Club
 JK Nõmme Kalju
 Estonian Cup
 Runners Up: 2008–09

References

1981 births
Living people
Brazilian expatriate sportspeople in Hungary
People from Petrópolis
Brazilian expatriate sportspeople in Austria
Ferencvárosi TC footballers
Brazilian expatriate sportspeople in Estonia
Nõmme Kalju FC players
Expatriate footballers in Austria
Brazilian footballers
Expatriate footballers in Estonia
Expatriate footballers in Hungary
Association football midfielders
Expatriate footballers in Finland
Atlantis FC players
Brazilian expatriate sportspeople in Finland
Expatriate footballers in Gibraltar
Association football defenders
Brazilian expatriate sportspeople in Gibraltar
Meistriliiga players
Sportspeople from Rio de Janeiro (state)